Cyperus subtenax is a species of sedge that is endemic to Angola.

The species was first formally described by the botanist Georg Kükenthal in 1932.

See also
 List of Cyperus species

References

subtenax
Taxa named by Georg Kükenthal
Plants described in 1932
Flora of Angola